The Soviet–Finnish Non-Aggression Pact  was a non-aggression treaty signed in 1932 by representatives of Finland and the Soviet Union. The pact was unilaterally renounced by the Soviet Union in 1939 after having committed a deception operation in Mainila in which it shelled its own village and blamed Finland.

The Soviet Union had started negotiations regarding non-aggression agreements with its neighbouring European countries during the Japanese invasion of Manchuria in order to secure its borders. The negotiations between Finland and the Soviet Union started last, but ended first. The pact was signed by A.S. Yrjö-Koskinen and ambassador Ivan Maiski on 22 January 1932 at the Finnish Ministry of Foreign Affairs in Helsinki. It was ratified by the Parliament of Finland in July 1932, only after the representatives of Estonia, Latvia, and Lithuania had signed their own pacts with the Soviet Union. Both parties of the pact agreed to respect each other's borders and agreed to stay neutral in each other's conflicts. Disputes were to be solved peacefully and neutrally. The Soviet Union proposed a ten-year period of validity of the pact in the spring of 1934, and wanted Finland, Estonia, Latvia, and Lithuania to give a joint answer for it. Finland was the last of these four countries to agree to the pact due to slight differences in its agreements with the Soviet Union. The pact was extended to 31 December 1945 in Moscow on 7 April 1934. The extension was signed by Finnish Foreign Minister Aarno Yrjö-Koskinen and Soviet Foreign Minister Maxim Litvinov.

The pact was renounced by the Soviet Union on 28 November 1939, two days before its invasion of Finland began. The Soviets falsely claimed that Finland had shelled a Soviet village. According to Article 5 of the pact, both parties were to call for a joint commission to examine the incident. Finland tried to call one, but the Soviet Union refused.

See also 
 Treaty of Tartu
 Soviet–Polish Non-Aggression Pact
 Franco-Soviet Treaty of Mutual Assistance
 German–Polish declaration of non-aggression

References

External links
 1932 Pact
Original Text 
Translated Text  
 1934 Continuation Pact
Original Text 
Translated Text 

1932 in Finland
Political history of Finland
Peace treaties of Finland
Treaties of Finland
Treaties of the Soviet Union
Finland–Soviet Union relations
1932 in the Soviet Union
Winter War
Non-aggression pacts
Treaties concluded in 1932